The Sandman is the first novel by English writer Miles Gibson.

The book was originally published by Heinemann in 1984, and subsequently translated into several languages.

Plot
The book records the life and times of a good-natured serial killer (William "Mackerel" Burton) who murders for the fun of it.

Reception
More "Kind Hearts and Coronets" than "Hannibal Lecter" the novel nonetheless attracted criticism at the time for the way in which Gibson generated such sympathy from the reader for his anti-hero.

Novels by Miles Gibson
1984 British novels
Heinemann (publisher) books